Michael James Mason (born 27 August 1974) is a former New Zealand cricketer, born in Carterton. He played Test matches and One Day Internationals for New Zealand.

Domestic career
He played domestic cricket for Central Districts. After recovering from an operation on a hernia during late 2008, he was back playing domestic cricket. He was also signed by the Kings XI Punjab for the Pepsi IPL 2013 as a replacement for the injured Ryan Harris. Mason's last match for Central Districts was on 12 February 2012. About a month before his retirement from the Central Districts, Mason helped complete what The West Australian thought might be a candidate for the "greatest cricket catch ever" by collaborating with teammate Bevan Small.

Small, while fielding as the 12th man in January 2012 during the New Zealand domestic HRV Twenty20 competition (currently known as the Super Smash) as a 19-year-old, made a spectacular catch assist on the boundary line; Mason, who was 37 at the time, completed the catch. The Laws of Cricket indicate that a catch can be initiated outside of the boundary line so long as the player is airborne whenever they are touching the ball; this must remain so until the ball is back inside the boundary (either completed by the same player or, as was the case with Small and Mason, completed by a teammate). A commentator during the match called it "possibly the most brilliant piece of fielding I've ever seen". The video has received millions of views across various online uploads.

In 2009, Mason was part of the New Zealand A vs the England Lions at Pukekura Park, where New Zealand A won the match. Mason is currently living in Pahiatua.

International career 

Michael Mason was part of the New Zealand squad for the tour of England in 2008. He took 3 wickets against Essex and was 12th man against England Lions. He was part of the New Zealand squad for the 2007 Cricket World Cup.

After cricket 

Following retirement in 2012, Mason began coaching the Manawatu senior team as well as the junior rep teams out of Palmerston North. Mason currently resides in Palmerston North, Manawatu, and works as a builder.

References

External links
 
 

1974 births
Living people
Central Districts cricketers
New Zealand One Day International cricketers
New Zealand Test cricketers
New Zealand Twenty20 International cricketers
Cricketers at the 2007 Cricket World Cup
New Zealand cricketers
People from Carterton, New Zealand
People educated at Tararua College
North Island cricketers